Zdenko Blažeković (23 September 1915 – 12 January 1947) was a Croatian fascist official who held several posts in the World War II Ustaše regime in the Independent State of Croatia (NDH). He was the student commissar at the Ustaše University Centre (USS), leader of the male Ustaše Youth organisation and a sports commissioner in the NDH. 

Born in the town of Bihać, he graduated from high school in Osijek before applying to join a polytechnic college in Zagreb with the intention of becoming a builder. He was a member of various Croatian cultural and athletic organizations during his youth, and even played as goalkeeper for Hajduk Osijek and HAŠK football clubs.

Briefly a member of the conservative Croatian Peasant Party (HSS), Blažeković was imprisoned several times by the Yugoslav authorities because of his involvement with various Croatian youth organizations which saw him often involved in clashes with left-wing students. He joined the far-right Ustaše in 1939, and following the Axis invasion of Yugoslavia and the establishment of the Ustaše-led NDH in April 1941, went on to be appointed to the newly formed Ustaše supervisory committee by Slavko Kvaternik. That same month he also became the leader of the Ustaše University Headquarters and the Ustaše Youth, charged with organizing student bodies at the University of Zagreb and promoting Ustaše's policy of preventing all non-Croats from attending universities in the country.

In 1942 he was involved in the formation of the 13th Ustaše Assault Company and by 1943 had attained a seat in the Croatian Parliament. Between 1942 and 1943 he was involved in recruiting students to join Ante Pavelić's personal bodyguard and was promoted to the rank of major. He held the position of head of the Ustaše University Headquarters and Ustaše Youth until January 1945, when he was appointed Commissioner for Physical Education and Sport. Blažeković fled Zagreb from the advancing Yugoslav Partisans in May 1945 and ended up in a refugee camp in Salzburg, Austria. In August, he was arrested by American forces who extradited him to Yugoslavia on 12 February 1946. He was tried in Zagreb on 12 January 1947, sentenced to death, and executed the same day.

Early life and family
Zdenko Blažeković was born on 23 September 1915 in the town of Bihać, the son of local politician Emilijan "Milan" Blažeković. Ethnically Croat, the Blažeković family was descended from  15th century tribesmen in the town of Livno.

Blažeković finished high school in Osijek and later applied to join a polytechnic college in Zagreb with the intention of becoming a builder. In 1935, he became a member of the "Croatian Academic Society August Šenoa" (HADAŠ) and by 1936 he became its vice-president. A versatile athlete, he played as goalkeeper for the football clubs Hajduk in Osijek and HAŠK in Zagreb. He also played tennis and was one of the founders of the Drava rowing club in Osijek. For a short period of time, Blažeković was a member of the Croatian Peasant Party (HSS). After leaving the party, he became involved in various Croatian youth organizations and was imprisoned several times in Zagreb and Osijek as a result. During this time, he was also involved in numerous violent confrontations with Communist students.

After attending a public celebration of HSS leader Vladko Maček's birthday on 20 June 1935, Blažeković was imprisoned by Yugoslav authorities and tortured for twelve days in prison on the island of Korčula. He was subsequently taken to Dubrovnik and charged with conspiring against the Yugoslav state but was not convicted. In 1939, he joined the Ustaše, a Croatian fascist organization which advocated armed struggle in achieving Croatia's independence from the Kingdom of Yugoslavia. During this period, he came into contact with the fascist leader Slavko Kvaternik. From late 1940 to early 1941, Blažeković was pursued by Yugoslav authorities because of his association with the Ustaše and hid in Zagreb to avoid capture.

World War II

Invasion of Yugoslavia
On 6 April 1941 Axis forces invaded Yugoslavia. Poorly equipped and poorly trained, the Royal Yugoslav Army was quickly defeated. The country was then dismembered by the occupying forces and the extreme nationalist and fascist Croat leader of the Ustaše Ante Pavelić – who had been in exile in Benito Mussolini's Italy – was appointed Poglavnik (leader) of a newly established Ustaše-led Croatian state, the Independent State of Croatia ( or NDH). The NDH combined almost all of present-day countries of Croatia and Bosnia and Herzegovina, as well as parts of Serbia, into what was described as an "Italian-German quasi-protectorate". Under the Ustaše regime, genocidal policies were implemented and directed against the Serb, Jewish and Romani populations living within the country.

Command of the Ustaše University Centre and Ustaše Youth
On 11 April, Kvaternik named Blažeković to the newly formed Ustaše supervisory committee. On 23 April, Blažeković led a crowd of more than 1,100 Croatian students as they gathered in the courtyard of the University of Zagreb before going to St. Mark's Square in central Zagreb to watch Pavelić give a speech. Here, Blažeković and the students swore loyalty to the Poglavnik and the NDH. In a speech of his own, Blažeković told Pavelić that he and the students were ready to follow him "in life and death". When the Ustaše supervisory committee was disbanded on 9 May, Blažeković was named a commissioner in the main headquarters of the NDH. That same month, he was named the commander of the Ustaše University Headquarters (USS). Although this organization technically required all students in the NDH to become members, most kept away from membership. Increasingly, the USS became a wing of the NDH's student elite with strict rules of membership and privileges, with members attending rallies at which Pavelić spoke and wearing Ustaše uniform. 

In an interview with Novi list, Blažeković stated that all work at the University of Zagreb would be "in harmony with the new Ustaša spirit ... with which youth had been imbued for years in the decades when the university was the "battleground" of the Croatian struggle for liberation." He went on to say that the first priority of the USS was to be the social welfare of students and the expansion of student dining rooms and residential halls. He declared that the structure of the university would change to conform with Ustaše principles – each faculty would have its own camp, consisting of a camp leader and seven adjutants responsible for military training, socio-economic welfare, contacts, sports, professional training, education and journals. Blažeković explained that for the first year of academic study, the university would employ "veteran warriors" as teachers who were to be replaced by fully trained "younger forces" who had spent the previous year preparing for their new roles. Furthermore, he stated that student volunteers would collaborate in the creation and popularization of the USS and other Ustaše organizations, which, once they had established themselves in university life, were to establish a professional, non-ideological student organization meant to incorporate all Croatian students. When asked if Serbs and Jews were to be permitted to attend universities in the NDH, Blažeković replied: "In the coming academic year, the university will be swept clean of foreigners hostile to Croatians and the Ustaše movement, and in this way our endeavours at the university will be made easier." Later, while dining with the wife of a Swedish diplomat, Blažeković boasted of the large number of Serbs he had killed, claiming that he placed the ears of murdered Serbs on a necklace worn over his smoking jacket.

At the same time that he was appointed the leader of the USS, Blažeković was also named commander of the male Ustaše Youth organisation. In its first months, many young Croats joined the movement, with recruitment being fuelled  mostly by extreme Croatian nationalism. In addition, many were motivated to join because the Youth provided athletic, intellectual and artistic training for "the next generation of Ustaše leaders." For others, membership gave "a sense of meaning to their lives" and was appealing because it represented "a youthful rebellion against the Yugoslav state." By May, some Ustaše Youth camps publicly announced their refusal to accept new members as they lacked the capacity to do so. Although it is unclear how many young Croats joined the movement, Blažeković claimed a figure of half a million members. He defined the Ustaše Youth as a "secular movement" meant to promote "brotherly cooperation and mutual life" of peasant, working-class and intellectual youths in the NDH.

In late 1941 Blažeković's father was appointed mayor of Osijek, holding this position until 1942. That year, the younger Blažeković became involved in the formation of the 13th Ustaše Assault Company, using his position as commander of the Ustaše Youth to convince many young Croats to join. In February 1942, he became a member of the Croatian Parliament. Between 1942 and 1943 he participated in recruiting many students for Ante Pavelić's personal bodyguards (Poglavnikov Tjelesni Zdrug, PTZ) He was later promoted to the rank of army major. In 1944, he wrote a book titled The Youth and the State.

Commissioner for Physical Education and Sport
Blažeković held the post of commander of the USS and commander of the Ustaše Youth until January 1945, when he was named Commissioner at the State Directorate for Physical Education and Sports (DVTOŠ) in the NDH. Upon taking this position, he introduced strict new sports laws that emphasized discipline during football matches and criminalised monetary and material rewards for athletes. Blažeković justified the new laws by saying: "Croatian sport is an amateur sport, and as such it will remain". Attempting to tackle the problem of unruly crowds, he introduced new laws banning disorderly spectators from ever entering football stadiums. Warnings by Blažeković and the DVTOŠ were regularly printed in daily party newspapers, calling for citizens and athletes to abide by the new laws.

Capture and execution
As Allied forces descended on Zagreb, Blažeković left the city on 6 May 1945 and fled from Slovenia into Austria. He was subsequently placed in a refugee camp in Salzburg. On 28 August, American forces arrested him and sent him to a detainment camp before having him extradited to Yugoslavia on 12 February 1946. Blažeković was tried in Zagreb on 12 January 1947, sentenced to death, and executed the same day.

Notes

References
 
 
 
 

1915 births
1947 deaths
People from Bihać
People from the Condominium of Bosnia and Herzegovina
Croats of Bosnia and Herzegovina
Croatian Peasant Party politicians
Ustaše
Croatian collaborators with Nazi Germany
Croatian collaborators with Fascist Italy
Executed Croatian people
Executed Yugoslav collaborators with Nazi Germany
Genocide of Serbs in the Independent State of Croatia perpetrators
HAŠK players
Croatian nationalists
Association football goalkeepers
Croatian footballers
World War II prisoners of war held by the United States
People extradited to Yugoslavia
Executed mass murderers